Y Ro Wen is a mountain just north of Blaenau Ffestiniog, North Wales and forms part of the Moelwynion.

It may be climbed from Dolwyddelan or Cwm Penmachno. The popular climbing crag of Craig Alltrem can be found on its western slope. The summit has a shelter cairn, with views of Moel Penamnen, Manod Mawr North Top, Y Gamallt and Moel Siabod.

References

External links
 www.geograph.co.uk : photos of Moel Penamnen and surrounding area

Bro Machno
Dolwyddelan
Mountains and hills of Conwy County Borough
Mountains and hills of Snowdonia